Snatam Kaur Khalsa  (born 1972 in Trinidad, Colorado), is an American singer, songwriter and author.  Kaur performs new age Indian devotional music, kirtan, and tours the world as a peace activist. The surname "Kaur", meaning "princess", is shared by all female Sikhs.

Early life and education
Her family moved to California when Snatam was two, living in Long Beach and Sacramento.  When Snatam was six, the family visited India, where her mother studied kirtan. Snatam lived on a ranch near Bolinas, California until 8th grade and then moved to Mill Valley in 1986. During her childhood, she played kirtan with her mother in Gurdwaras and at Sikh religious ceremonies. She attended Tamalpais High School in Mill Valley. While at Tam High, she played violin in the school orchestra and began songwriting. Bob Weir of the Grateful Dead coached Kaur and her classmates before they performed her song "Saving the Earth" at an Earth Day concert in San Francisco on April 22, 1990.

Snatam was also active in social and environmental causes while in high school, serving as president of a social action club known as "Students for Justice" in her senior year. The club started a campus recycling program and organized environmental awareness programs. The club also led the effort to change the school mascot and sports team names from the Indians to the Red Tailed Hawk in 1989 and 1990, inspired by a speech given at the school by Sacheen Littlefeather.

After graduating from Tam, Snatam attended Mills College in Oakland, California, receiving a bachelor's degree in biochemistry.  She then returned to India to study Kirtan under her mother's teacher, Bhai Hari Singh. In 1997, Kaur began a career as a food technologist with Peace Cereals in Eugene, Oregon.

Snatam's music
In 2000, Kaur signed with Spirit Voyage Records — the founder of which, Guru Ganesha Singh Khalsa, became her manager and guitarist. Her professional collaboration has included new age music producer Thomas Barquee and occasionally her mother, Prabhu Nam Kaur Khalsa, also a musician.

Discography

The Celebrate Peace tour
From 2003 to 2009 Snatam Kaur spent much of each year on a perpetual tour called the "Celebrate Peace tour."  Her tour took her several times across North America, twice to Europe, and twice to South America.  The tour included performances at schools, hospices, juvenile detention centers, and other facilities. Kaur is a featured teacher and "Peace Ambassador" for the 3HO Foundation (a non-governmental organization affiliated with the United Nations since 1996).  Snatam Kaur toured with her longtime musical partner Guru Ganesha Singh Khalsa, a guitarist and vocalist, and various other musicians. After her marriage, her husband, graphic artist, Sopurkh Singh also traveled with Snatam Kaur.

Sat Nam Fest, recent and current tours
Since the birth of her daughter, Snatam Kaur has considerably scaled down her performances, though she still comes out for the Sat Nam Fest Kundalini Yoga and Music Festivals held annually in Pennsylvania, California and Mexico, bringing her daughter and husband in tow.  Her band in her current (2019) tour includes Grecco Buratto (guitar), Ram Dass Khalsa (clarinet, guitar, vocals) and Sukhmani Kaur (tabla).

Books

Sikh influence on Kaur's music
Sikhism is a religion that began in India in the mid-fifteenth century with the first Guru, known as Guru Nanak Dev Ji (1469-1539 C.E.). The essence of being a Sikh is that one lives one’s life according to the teachings of the Sikh Gurus, devoting time to meditating on God and the scriptures, chanting, and living life in a way that benefits other people and the world.  Kaur’s teacher, Yogi Bhajan (1929-2004), was influential in helping promote the Sikh tradition in the West.

Sikhism is based on the Shabad Guru. On Kaur's official website she explains, “Shabad is the sacred energy or recitation of sound, and Guru means the living teacher. For Sikhs, our living Guru exists within the sacred words of our tradition and physically within the Sikh holy book known as the Guru Granth Sahib.”

Reviews and critical acclaim

Snatam Kaur has received numerous positive reviews of her concerts and albums, especially in alternative and yogic media.  These include LA Yoga, The Olympian (Olympia, WA), Light Connection, The Union (Nevada County, CA), The New Sunday Times (Malaysia), and Yoga Chicago.  In 2010, her album Essential Snatam Kaur: Sacred Chants for Healing peaked at number nine on the Billboard listing of Top New Age Music Albums.  Snatam Kaur's career also received a boost when it became known that her music was a favorite of Oprah Winfrey.
Kaur was nominated for a 2019 Grammy for her album Beloved.

Personal life
Snatam lives in the United States with her husband Sopurkh Singh, whom she married in January 2006, and their daughter, Jap Preet Kaur. Snatam is the granddaughter of Dr. Stanley Biber, pioneering Gender Affirming Surgeon, who practiced in Trinidad, Colorado until his death 1/16/06.

References

External links
 
 Spirit Voyage, Snatam Kaur's Record Label
 3HO Foundation 
 

1972 births
Living people
American Sikhs
American women singer-songwriters
Tamalpais High School alumni
Mills College alumni
Kirtan performers
People from Trinidad, Colorado
Performers of Sikh music
American new-age musicians
21st-century American singers
21st-century American women singers
American yoga teachers
Singer-songwriters from Colorado